Monir Vakili (December 19, 1924 – February 28, 1983) was an Iranian soprano.
She was the first Persian singer to popularize Persian Folk Songs in Iran and the international music scene.

Biography

Monir was born to a family of art and music enthusiasts. Her father encouraged her interest in opera and supported her decision to study abroad. Monir studied voice and theater at the Conservatoire National Supérieur de Musique et De Danse de Paris and continued her training in opera directing at the New England Conservatory of Music in Boston, Mass. Monir started the first opera company in Iran. She gave performances in roles including Madama Butterfly, Mimi in La Bohème, Violetta in La Traviata, and Liu in Turandot, at the Rudaki Hall. She intended to bring the level of artistry in Iran up to international standards. She produced and hosted a series in the National Iranian Television featuring selections from Rudaki Hall, and created an opera film festival and established the Academy of Voice, a government-funded, co-educational boarding school to educate and train students in the art of opera and choral singing. In 1951 Monir placed first at the Berlin Youth Festival (in the vocal category) and in 1975 she was the recipient of the Forough Farrokhzad Award. She recorded an album, "Chants et Danses de Perse" in Paris in 1958, of songs from different regions of Iran. It won the Grand Prix du Disque of the Académie Charles Cros. Monir died in 1983. Baazgasht ("Resurrection"), is a rendition of the album.

Monir attended the American School in Hamedan where she performed as soloist and member of the church choir.

Awards, honours and other details

She studied at the Conservatoire Nationale de Musique de Paris 1949–52, majoring in Operatic Singing and Performing Arts.

She was a vocal coach at Tehran National Conservatory of Music, 1955–57.
She performed recitals at the French Institute and Roumanian Embassy, Tehran, 1955–56.
She studied at the New England Conservatory in Boston, Massachusetts, 1960–61, majoring in Opera Directing.
She staged the first televised opera scenes from Madama Butterfly and La Traviata on Sabet Television, May 1961.
She was a Radio Tehran and Association of Friends of the French Culture-Soloist and Choir Member, 1969–71.

She was Executive Director of Rudaki Hall Programs for NIRTV (Performing Arts Program), Tehran, Iran,
Executive Producer of the first Opera Film Festival in the world at the Rudaki Hall in Tehran, Iran, 1977, and
Executive Director and Producer and Host of the Television Program for NIRTV: Rudaki Hall Presents (the best programs of the year were telecast all over the country).

She appeared in 19 operas as the lead or second lead and directed two major operas in Tehran.

She was founder of the first Opera Company of Tehran,
creator and founder of the Academy of Voice, Tehran, Iran, 1975,
and member of the Board of Directors of the International Shiraz Arts Festival.

Awards

She was recipient of the Best Folk Songs Award, Berlin Youth Festival, 1951.
Recipient of the Forough Farrokhzad Award, 1976.

Personal life
She toured and performed extensively in Russia, Tajikestan, Bulgaria, Romania, France, Germany, Italy and the United States. She was married to Abdol Majid Majidi.  They had two daughters: Scheherazade (a.k.a. ZaZa) and Djamileh. Vakili died in a car accident in Belgium on February 28, 1983, as her husband's car collided with a tank. They had been driving to an informal gathering with prominent diplomats.

References

External links
 

1923 births
1983 deaths
Conservatoire de Paris alumni
20th-century Iranian women singers
Iranian opera singers
Iranian television producers
Music directors (opera)
New England Conservatory alumni
Opera managers
People from Tabriz
Road incident deaths in Belgium
20th-century women opera singers
20th-century conductors (music)
Women television producers
Burials at Père Lachaise Cemetery